RPL-554 (LS-193,855) is a drug candidate for respiratory diseases.  It is an analog of trequinsin and, like trequinsin, is a highly selective inhibitor of the phosphodiesterase enzyme, PDE3; indeed, it is >3000-times more potent against PDE3 than PDE4. As of October 2015, inhaled RPL-554 delivered via a nebulizer was in development for COPD and had been studied in asthma.

PDE3 inhibitors act as bronchodilators, while PDE4 inhibitors have an anti-inflammatory effect.

RPL554 was part of a family of compounds invented by Sir David Jack, former head of R&D for GlaxoSmithKline, and Alexander Oxford, a medicinal chemist; the patents on their work were assigned to Vernalis plc. 

In 2005, Rhinopharma Ltd, acquired the rights to the intellectual property from Vernalis.   Rhinopharma was a startup founded in Vancouver, Canada in 2004 by Michael Walker, Clive Page, and David Saint, to discover and develop drugs for chronic respiratory diseases, and intended to develop RPL-554, delivered with an inhaler, first for allergic rhinitis, then asthma, then for COPD.   RPL554 was synthesized at a contract research organization, under the supervision of Oxford, and was studied in collaboration with Page's lab at King’s College, London. In 2006 Rhinopharma recapitalized and was renamed Verona Pharma plc.

References 

Phenol ethers
Lactams
Ureas
Imines
PDE4 inhibitors
PDE3 inhibitors